These are the official results of the athletics competition at the 2021 Junior Pan American Games which took place between November 30 and December 4, 2021, at the Estadio Olímpico Pascual Guerrero in Cali, Colombia.

Men's results

100 meters

Heats – November 30Wind:Heat 1: -1.2 m/s, Heat 2: -0.5 m/s

Final – December 1Wind: -0.2 m/s

200 meters

Heats – December 2Wind:Heat 1: +0.2 m/s, Heat 2: -0.7 m/s

Final – December 3Wind: +0.4 m/s

400 meters

Heats – December 1

Final – December 2

800 meters
December 4

1500 meters
December 3

5000 meters
November 30

10,000 meters
December 3

110 meters hurdles

Heats – November 30Wind:Heat 1: -0.5 m/s, Heat 2: +0.1 m/s

Final – December 4Wind: -0.2 m/s

400 meters hurdles

Heats – November 30

Final – December 2

3000 meters steeplechase
December 4

4 × 100 meters relay
December 2

4 × 400 meters relay
December 3

20,000 meters walk
December 1

High jump
December 3

Pole vault
December 4

Long jump
December 1

Triple jump
December 4

Shot put
December 1

Discus throw
December 4

Hammer throw
December 2

Javelin throw
November 30

Decathlon
November 30–December 1

Women's results

100 meters

Heats – November 30Wind:Heat 1: 0.0 m/s, Heat 2: -0.5 m/s, Heat 3: -0.2 m/s

Final – December 1Wind: +0.1 m/s

200 meters

Heats – December 2Wind:Heat 1: -1.4 m/s, Heat 2: -1.4 m/s

Final – December 3Wind: 0.0 m/s

400 meters
December 2

800 meters
December 1

1500 meters
December 2

5000 meters
December 3

10,000 meters
November 30

100 meters hurdles
December 3Wind: -0.6 m/s

400 meters hurdles

Heats – November 30

Final – December 2

3000 meters steeplechase
December 4

4 × 100 meters relay
December 2

4 × 400 meters relay
December 3

20,000 meters walk
December 3

High jump
December 2

Pole vault
December 2

Long jump
November 30

Triple jump
December 3

Shot put
December 3

Discus throw
November 30

Hammer throw
December 4

Javelin throw
December 3

Heptathlon
December 1–2

Mixed results

4 × 400 meters relay
December 4

References

Junior Pan American Games
2021